Mandıra Filozofu İstanbul is a 2015 Turkish comedy film.

Cast

See also
Mandıra Filozofu

References

External links

Resmi site
YouTube'da fragmanı
Beyazperde - Mandıra Filozofu İstanbul
Sinematürk - Mandıra Filozofu İstanbul
Sinemalar - Mandıra Filozofu İstanbul

Turkish comedy films
2015 films